A list of films produced in the Philippines in the 1970s. For an A-Z see :Category:Philippine films.

References

External links
 Filipino film at the Internet Movie Database

1970s
Films
Philippines